The Bristol Draco was an air-cooled nine-cylinder radial engine from the British manufacturer Bristol Aeroplane Company. It was essentially a version of their famous Pegasus converted to use a fuel injection system.

The carburettor had only a simple butterfly valve, while two injection pumps supplied the cylinders with fuel, one handling four cylinders and the other, five. Injection was into the manifold before they split into the two intake valves for each cylinder. The engine was flight-tested in a Westland Wapiti. Since the expenditure did not bring a considerable improvement, development was halted.

Specifications (Draco)

See also

References

Notes

Bibliography

 Lumsden, Alec. British Piston Engines and their Aircraft. Marlborough, Wiltshire: Airlife Publishing, 2003. .

Aircraft air-cooled radial piston engines
Draco
1930s aircraft piston engines